The Endangered Planet Foundation (EPF) is a 501(c)(3) non-profit organization founded in the United States whose mission is to raise awareness of pro-environmental causes via dialog and the arts, recognizing that advances in technology can provide many of the answers that will lead to a sustainable future.

History 

EPF was founded by Charles Michael Murray, a graphic designer and commercial photographer as the philanthropic arm of the Endangered Planet Gallery, an art space opened in Laguna Beach, California in 2005. Mr. Murray had previously organized and participated in a number of community-oriented events, including the largest environmental gathering in Orange County, California: the November 1989 landmark Laguna Canyon wilderness preservation movement, “Save Our Canyons - Walk.”  
   Murray conceived the Walk and co-wrote a public service announcement that was produced and performed by Grammy Award-winning artist, Jose Feliciano. The actions of several groups, elected officials, prominent citizens such as John Denver, as well as support of the Walk’s 8500+ participants, resulted in preserving open space in the Laguna Canyon Greenbelt.

Overview 

EPF Board of Directors and Advisors have included Earth Day Founder, Visionary and Peace Advocate, John McConnell, Joanne Tawfilis, a Bob Marley Peace Award winner and former United Nations executive, attorney Jonathan R. Ellowitz, and noted environmental author, Chris Prelitz.

Activities 

Early fundraising efforts organized by EPF include the public screenings of the documentary films “The 11th Hour” and “One: The Movie.”  EPF also co-produced a popular town hall meeting entitled “Laguna Beach – Earth Trustee,” featuring a discussion panel headed by John McConnell and a City of Laguna Beach Proclamation stating Earth Day coincides with the vernal equinox.

Additional activities aimed at raising awareness of environmental and humanitarian issues included supporting Habitat for Humanity of Orange County, promoting/co-funding Sailors Without Borders in its mission to bring aid (such as solar panels and much-needed goods) to the victims of the 2010 Haiti earthquake, and a collaboration connecting arts with the environment known as the “Environmental Mile” which toured internationally as part of the Art Miles Mural Project (AMMP).

EPF sponsored and organized the One Earth | One Dream EcoFests in 2008 and 2009 with grants made available by entities such as the City of Laguna Beach. The events drew thousands of participants to view green exhibitors, award-winning films, eco-themed design and art exhibits. Also featured were symposiums where keynote speakers, including photographer and National Geographic’s Eco-Ambassador, Chris Jordan, former UN Ambassador Anwarul Chowdhury, Wayne Nastri, of the U.S. Environmental Protection Agency, and noted artist, Wyland, discussed environmental concerns, examining topics such as environmental impacts on women’s and children's health, food and farming practices, eco-business, sustainable living and automotive fossil fuel reduction.  EPF, One Earth | One Dream provided support and sponsorship of the Laguna Beach Earth Day & Kelp Fest in 2012.

External links 
Endangered Planet Foundation
Endangered Planet Gallery
CMM Studio
Sailors Without Borders
Art Miles Mural Project

References 

Environmental organizations based in California
Charities based in California
Organizations established in 2007